Saint Petersburg is a card-driven designer board game, with the design of the game credited to Michael Tummelhofer, a pseudonym for Michael Bruinsma, Jay Tummelson and Bernd Brunnhofer.  Most of the design work was done by Brunnhofer.  The game was published in 2004 by Hans im Glück and Rio Grande Games, and won the Deutscher Spiele Preis and International Gamers Award for that year.

The first expansion, by Karl-Heinz Schmiel, is The Banquet, appearing first as an insert in a magazine, and consists of 12 new cards (3 normal and 9 special). The second expansion, by  Tom Lehmann, is The New Society and consists of 36 cards (28 normal, 7 replacement, and a fifth role card), plus rules to expand the game to five players.  Both expansions were bundled together and sold as the St. Petersburg Expansion.

In 2014, a successful crowdfunding campaign on the German website Spieleschmiede led to the printing of a second edition of Saint Petersburg. This edition included brand-new art for all of the cards; rebalanced some of the cards; and added a new expansion, The Market, which introduced a new scoring mechanism and allowed five players to play the game, replacing The New Society as the recommended five-player expansion. This edition also included the new cards from both expansions from the first edition plus four brand-new expansion modules.

References

External links
 
 computer version of the game at Westpark Gamers
 online version of the game at Yucata.de
  Review of Saint Petersburg 

Deutscher Spiele Preis winners
Hans im Glück games
Rio Grande Games games
Cultural depictions of Peter the Great
Board games about history

Board games introduced in 2004